Bobby Dunne (28 March 1949 – 13 November 1998 (aged 49) was an Australian professional feather/super featherweight boxer of the 1960s and '70s who won the Commonwealth featherweight title, his professional fighting weight varied from , i.e. featherweight to , i.e. super featherweight.

References

External links

 Image - Bobby Dunne

1949 births
1998 deaths
Featherweight boxers
Place of birth missing
Place of death missing
Super-featherweight boxers
Australian male boxers
Commonwealth Boxing Council champions